Manuel Muñoz Muñoz (28 April 1928 – 17 December 2022) was a Chilean footballer who played as a forward for Chile in the 1950 FIFA World Cup. He also played for Colo-Colo.

Muñoz died on 17 December 2022, at the age of 94.

References

External links

1928 births
2022 deaths
People from Tocopilla
Chilean footballers
Association football forwards
Chile international footballers
Colo-Colo footballers
C.D. Arturo Fernández Vial footballers
1950 FIFA World Cup players
20th-century Chilean people